Franklin County is a county located in the northeastern part of the U.S. state of Georgia. As of the 2020 census, the population was 23,424. The county seat is Carnesville. On February 25, 1784, Franklin and Washington became Georgia's eighth and ninth counties, with Franklin named in honor of patriot Benjamin Franklin.

In its original form, Franklin County included all of the territory now in Banks, Barrow, Clarke, Jackson, Oconee, and Stephens counties, and parts of the modern-day Gwinnett, Hall, Hart, and Madison counties, as well as three counties that are now part of South Carolina. Franklin County has several miles of shoreline on Lake Hartwell.

Economic development
The Franklin County Industrial Building Authority, one of only seven created by a Georgia constitutional amendment, actively seeks and recruits new industries to the county. The Authority consists of seven members: each of the five mayors from the cities within Franklin County, and two at-large members selected by the Board of Commissioners.

Geography
The county is located in the Piedmont region of the state.

The majority of Franklin County is located in the Broad River sub-basin of the Savannah River basin, with just the northeastern corner, north of Lavonia, located in the Tugaloo River sub-basin of the same Savannah River basin. Franklin County is also located on Lake Hartwell.

Adjacent counties
 Stephens County (north)
 Oconee County, South Carolina (northeast)
 Hart County (east)
 Elbert County (southeast)
 Madison County (south)
 Banks County (west)

Education

Franklin County School system
The Franklin County School District (Georgia) supports grades from kindergarten to grade twelve. The system consists of three elementary schools, one middle school, one high school, and one alternative school. The Franklin County School System has a staff of over 600 and an enrollment of 3570 as of 2020. The system boasts a 90.7% graduation rate. FCSS is the largest employer in Franklin County.

Private schools
 Shepherd's Hill Academy, a Christian private school for grades 7-12

Colleges
 Emmanuel College (Georgia) is a private, Christian, liberal arts college located in Franklin Springs offering associate as well as bachelor's degrees. The college is a member of the NCAA Division II.

Attractions 
 Lake Hartwell, a man-made lake covering 56,000 acres built for flood control and recreation.
 Tugaloo State Park which is a 393-acre state park on the lake featuring a beach, campsites, and several nature trails.
 Victoria Bryant State Park, a 502-acre state park featuring a large 18-hole golf course, a swimming area on the Broad River, campsites, and an archery range.
 Cromer's Mill Covered Bridge
 Ty Cobb museum in Royston, Georgia.

Transportation

Major highways

  Interstate 85
  U.S. Route 29
  State Route 8
  State Route 17
  State Route 17 Business
  State Route 51
  State Route 59
  State Route 63
  State Route 77 Connector
  State Route 106
  State Route 145
  State Route 174
  State Route 184
  State Route 198
  State Route 281
  State Route 320
  State Route 326
  State Route 327
  State Route 328
  State Route 403 (unsigned designation for I-85)

Airports
Franklin County Airport (Georgia)(18A), featuring a 5000 ft runway and self-service 100LL and Jet A fuel.
Broad River Air Park(3GE3), a private airport community featuring a 3000 ft runway parallel to Interstate 85.

Infrastructure

Railroad
The Hartwell Railroad operates freight service through the eastern portion of Franklin County throughout the Martin, Lavonia, Canon, and Royston areas on the former Norfolk Southern line from Toccoa to Elberton.

Utilities
Electric service in Franklin County is provided by two customer-owned electric cooperatives, Hart EMC and Jackson EMC, as well as by Georgia Power, a subsidiary of Southern Company. Water utilities are provided by the cities of Lavonia, Martin, Royston, and Carnesville as well as by Franklin County in rural areas. Natural gas is supplied by the cities of Toccoa and Royston.

Hospital 
St. Mary's Healthcare System operates St. Mary's Sacred Heart Hospital in Lavonia which is the only hospital in Franklin County. The hospital features 56 inpatient beds, a 24/7 Emergency Department, a Critical Care Unit, 4 surgical suites, and an open to the public gym.

Demographics

2000 census
As of the census of 2000, there were 20,285 people, 7,888 households, and 5,695 families living in the county.  The population density was 77 people per square mile (30/km2).  There were 9,303 housing units at an average density of 35 per square mile (14/km2).  The racial makeup of the county was 89.49% White, 8.83% Black or African American, 0.21% Native American, 0.25% Asian, 0.02% Pacific Islander, 0.41% from other races, and 0.78% from two or more races.  0.92% of the population were Hispanic or Latino of any race.

There were 7,888 households, out of which 31.10% had children under the age of 18 living with them, 57.20% were married couples living together, 10.50% had a female householder with no husband present, and 27.80% were non-families. 24.60% of all households were made up of individuals, and 11.60% had someone living alone who was 65 years of age or older.  The average household size was 2.50 and the average family size was 2.96.

In the county, the population was spread out, with 23.90% under the age of 18, 9.60% from 18 to 24, 27.30% from 25 to 44, 23.80% from 45 to 64, and 15.30% who were 65 years of age or older.  The median age was 38 years. For every 100 females there were 94.10 males.  For every 100 females age 18 and over, there were 90.90 males.

The median income for a household in the county was $32,134, and the median income for a family was $38,463. Males had a median income of $29,474 versus $21,051 for females. The per capita income for the county was $15,767.  About 11.00% of families and 13.90% of the population were below the poverty line, including 16.80% of those under age 18 and 18.50% of those age 65 or over.

2010 census
As of the 2010 United States Census, there were 22,084 people, 8,540 households, and 5,979 families living in the county. The racial makeup of the county was 87.3% white, 8.4% black or African American, 0.5% Asian, 0.2% American Indian, 1.9% from other races, and 1.7% from two or more races. Those of Hispanic or Latino origin made up 3.9% of the population. In terms of ancestry, 17.6% were American, 9.7% were Irish, 9.7% were English, and 8.0% were German.

Of the 8,540 households, 31.8% had children under the age of 18 living with them, 53.6% were married couples living together, 11.2% had a female householder with no husband present, 30.0% were non-families, and 26.2% of all households were made up of individuals. The average household size was 2.51 and the average family size was 3.00. The median age was 40.9 years.

The median income for a household in the county was $36,739 and the median income for a family was $44,667. Males had a median income of $33,718 versus $28,713 for females. The per capita income for the county was $19,276. About 14.3% of families and 17.8% of the population were below the poverty line, including 22.5% of those under age 18 and 13.4% of those age 65 or over.

2020 census

As of the 2020 United States Census, there were 23,424 people, 8,460 households, and 6,123 families residing in the county.

Government
Franklin County is governed by a five-member board of commissioners, whose members are elected from multi-member districts. They serve alternating four-year terms. The county has a county manager system of government, in which day-to-day operation of the county is handled by a manager appointed by the board.  The chairman of the Board of Commissioners is elected by the citizens of the county.

Communities

Cities
 Canon
 Carnesville
 Franklin Springs
 Lavonia
 Royston

Town
 Martin

Census-designated place
 Gumlog

Notable people
Ernest Vandiver - Former Georgia Governor 1959–1963)
FPS Russia, YouTube personality
Ty Cobb, member of the Baseball Hall of Fame
Dee Dowis, Air Force Academy quarterback, Heisman Trophy finalist, Air Force career rushing yard record holder
Pauline Bray Fletcher, nurse and camp director
Tony Jones, professional football player in the NFL
Gary Walker, professional football player in the NFL
Terry Kay, author

Politics

See also

 National Register of Historic Places listings in Franklin County, Georgia
 Lake Hartwell
List of counties in Georgia

References

External links
 Franklin County historical marker
 Hebron Presbyterian Church historical marker
 Poplar Springs Methodist Camp Ground historical marker

 
1784 establishments in Georgia (U.S. state)
Georgia (U.S. state) counties
Populated places established in 1784
Northeast Georgia
Counties of Appalachia